IRrelevant Astronomy is a web series produced by NASA's Spitzer Space Telescope. Each episode explains a general science concept or reveals science news relevant to Spitzer. The "IR" in the title stands for "infrared", making the title refer to "infrared-relevant astronomy." The first episode launched on January 15, 2008 on the Spitzer Space Telescope website.

Cast and guest stars
Sean Astin appears in the episode "Part Two" as a scientist struggling to save the Spitzer Space Telescope. He also provides the voice of a badly-edited audiobook in the episode "Behind the Scenes: When Galaxies Collide", and appears as a fictional version of himself in "Behind the Scenes: Dead Stars".
Veronica Belmont appears in "Astronomy Anemone" and is consumed by her love of space science.
Felicia Day appears as a fictional version of herself in the comedic "Behind the Scenes: When Galaxies Collide".
 Cameron Diaz appears in the episode "RATS In Progress: The Mass of Asteroids".

Mark Hamill provides a cameo as a fictional version of himself in the episode "Robot Astronomy Talk Show: Gravity & the Great Attractor".
Linda Hamilton spoofs her robot-fighting character from the Terminator films in "Robot Astronomy Talk Show: Back In Time".
Casey McKinnon stars in the episode "Fusion vs. Fission".
Ellen McLain provides the voice of NOTGLaDOS in the episode "Fusion vs. Fission".
Amy Okuda appears as a fictional version of herself in the episode "Spaceship Spitzer: Bots of Both Worlds".
Sandeep Parikh plays a fictional version of himself in the episode "Behind the Scenes: Dead Stars".
Dean Stockwell lends a sympathetic ear to the evil robots in "Robot Astronomy Talk Show: Back In Time".
George Takei appears as a fictional version of himself in the episode "Robot Astronomy Talk Show: Gravity & the Great Attractor".

Alan Tudyk voices the titular microbe in the episode "Ask an Astronomy Brain Parasite".
Ed Wasser is credited as the voice role of robot IR-2 in the Robot Astronomy Talk Show series beginning with episode 8. He also appears as robot IR-2 in the episode "Spaceship Spitzer: Bots of Both Worlds".
Wil Wheaton appears in a dual role in the episode "Spaceship Spitzer: Bots of Both Worlds": as both himself and the voice of robot co-pilot Irwin. Wil next appears as "The Physician" in the Doctor Who spoof "Robot Astronomy Talk Show: Destroyer of Worlds", and cameos in the episode "Ask an Astronomy Brain Parasite".
Betty White voices a fictional version of herself in the episode "Part Two".

Production crew
Tim Pyle - director/co-creator/writer/animator/music composer/producer (2008–present)
- Tim worked for 10 years as an animator in the visual effects industry, including on the cult-favorite Invader Zim. Other projects include the Academy Award-nominated Jimmy Neutron, Emmy-nominated series Starship Troopers: the Series, and the Emmy-winning Children of Dune. He has personally won two Aegis Awards, a Telly Award, a CINE Golden Eagle, and 2006 & 2008 NASA awards for producing CG animation. He was the writer and director of Decaying Orbit, a sci-fi DVD feature.

Kenneth Kolb - producer (2009–present)
- Kenneth worked 10 years with the Walt Disney Company including Buena Vista Pictures Distribution, and as a coordinator for the Disney Channel. He has worked as the CFO of the Kendrea International Corporation for the past five years, produced several indie short films, and also currently works as a producer for Hogofilm, where he assisted with the production of the feature film Decaying Orbit. He began co-producing IRrelevant Astronomy starting with the episodes released in April 2009.

Dr. Carolyn Brinkworth - science writer (2013–present)
- Carolyn is a professional astronomer and educator. She graduated from the University of Southampton (U.K.) with her PhD in Astrophysics in 2005, and moved to Caltech, where she now works as the Education and Outreach Scientist for a number of NASA missions. She has been involved in education and public outreach for 15 years, since working at the U.K.‘s National Space Center in Leicester as an undergraduate, and is now studying for her MA in Education from Claremont Graduate University. In her spare time, Carolyn volunteers with The Trevor Project.

Jim Keller - co-creator/writer/producer (2008-2009, 2013)
- Jim is a member of the Screen Actors Guild, AFTRA, and the Actors' Equity Association, having appeared in shows like Days of our Lives and Melrose Place. His work on NASA's Ask an Astronomer video podcast series has won a Silver Telly Award, a Bronze Telly Award, an Aegis Award, and two Aegis Finalists. Additional awards include an Aegis Award and a CINE Golden Eagle.

Austin Wintory - music composer (2008-2009)
- Austin is a music composer for film, TV, and video games. He composed the score for Captain Abu Raed, a multiple award-winning film including the World Cinema Audience Award at the Sundance Film Festival in 2008. The film has been submitted by the Kingdom of Jordan for a 2009 Foreign Language Oscar. Austin also composed the score to Sony's Flow video game and expansion packs for the Sony PlayStation 3 & PSP, which earned strong reviews for the quality of music.

Shows

Ask an Astronomer: (25 episodes) Videos explaining basic and complex astronomy concepts in a simple way. Some episodes feature Dr. Michelle Thaller.

Ask an Astronomy Brain Parasite: (1 episode) Deep inside an astronomer's head, a parasite taps into his brain to learn about science.

Astronomy Anemone: (1 episode) A giant, surly man-eating sea anemone hosts an astronomy-themed talk show.

The Musical: (2 episodes) Mini-musicals, using song to teach astronomy concepts.

Behind the Scenes: (2 episodes) A mock behind-the-scenes look at the production of an educational video.

Part Two: (1 episode) A spoof of old action TV shows. The bulk of the episode shows scenes from a fictitious first episode that never existed, followed by a quick conclusion that appears to wrap everything up neatly.

Psych Out: (1 episode) A short about an astronomer visiting a therapist and taking a Rorschach-type inkblot test using images from the Spitzer Space Telescope.

Robot Astronomy Talk Show: (11 episodes) A series about robots who want to rule the Universe, while producing a talk show featuring interviews with celebrities and astronomers.

Dub'ya: (1 episode) An old movie is edited down and re-dubbed with dialogue about current Spitzer Space Telescope science.

Spaceship Spitzer: (3 episodes) Spitzer astronomer Dr. Michelle Thaller travels with a robot pilot in a spaceship based on the design of NASA's Spitzer Space Telescope.  Integrating live action and CG animation, there are currently two episodes: "Enemy Mine" and "The Slowlian Web."

M51 & Gizmo: (1 episode) Innocent alien M51 accidentally unleashes havoc on the planet Earth, and learns about how life exists in the Universe.

Skinfrared: (2 episodes) A series of direct educational narratives about infrared as it relates to the human body. Originally screened as part of the 2007 "Skin Festival" in Pasadena, CA.

Fusion vs. Fission: (1 episode) Spoofing GLaDOS from the videogame series Portal, a description of nuclear fusion in the Sun.

Episodes

Awards
On October 19, 2008, IRrelevant Astronomy was nominated for "Best Technology/Science Podcast" at the 2008 Podcast Awards.  It was one of 10 finalists in this category following a nomination process that included 281,000 votes.  In October 2009, the IRrelevant Astronomy episode "Psych Out" was an official selection at the 2nd annual Imagine Science Film Festival.  The IRrelevant Astronomy episode "M51 & Gizmo" has previously won multiple awards including an Aegis Award, CINE Golden Eagle, and winning a "Best of Festival" award at the Kids First Film Festival.

See also
 Episodes of Martha Speaks, a television series that mainly focuses on vocabulary, but occasionally also on astronomy

References

External links
 IRrelevant Astronomy website
 

American non-fiction web series
2000s YouTube series
2010s YouTube series
2008 web series debuts